Feeding Frenzy 2: Shipwreck Showdown is an arcade-style video game by American developer Sprout Games involving the marine food chain. It is the sequel to the 2004 game Feeding Frenzy. The game was developed and published by PopCap Games on February 6, 2006. It is also included in the PlayStation 3 retail version of Bejeweled 3, along with Zuma.

Gameplay
As in Feeding Frenzy, players have to control several fast-growing marine predators who are out to uncover a mystery lurking in the ocean. The game aims to avoid predators and obstacles while eating other smaller fish and creatures, eventually reaching the top of the food chain. Feeding Frenzy 2 includes 60 new levels which feature scenery such as new underwater worlds, coral reefs, deep sea caves, and sunken ships, including above-water challenges. The story mode has the player control a small butterflyfish named Boris. The player has Boris eat toward the top of the food chain. Along the way, the player encounters new prey and predators, both friendly and unfriendly, and must stop an alien fish named "The Intruder" from destroying the ocean.

Reception

References

External links
 Feeding Frenzy 2 Official site
 

2006 video games
Android (operating system) games
Windows games
Xbox 360 Live Arcade games
PlayStation 3 games
PlayStation Network games
PopCap games
Video games developed in the United States
Multiplayer and single-player video games
Video game sequels
Video games with underwater settings